Nazif ibn Yumn al-qass al-Rūmī al-Baghdādī (died 990) was a Melkite Christian  priest, philosopher and physician.

He flourished under the Buyid emir Adud al-Dawla. He was also a translator of Greek into Arabic, translating the Tenth book of Euclid. (H. Suter: Mathematiker, 68, 1900).

References

Further reading
 Nasrallah, J., Naẓīf Ibn Yumn: médecin, traducteur et théologien melkite du Xe siècle, in: Arabica 21 (1974): 303-312.
 Samir, S. Kh., Un traité du cheikh Abū ‘Alī Naẓīf ibn Yumn sur l’accord des chrétiens entre eux malgré leur désaccord dans l’expression, in: Mélanges de l’Université Saint-Joseph 51 (1990): 329–343.
 Seleznyov, Nikolai N., "Poslanie o edinstve" bagdadskogo mel’kita v sostave entsiklopedicheskogo "Svoda" arabojazychnogo kopta XIII veka, in: Gosudarstvo, religija, tserkov’ v Rossii i za rubezhom 3 (Moscow, 2010): 151-156.

990 deaths
10th-century physicians
Year of birth unknown
Physicians of the medieval Islamic world
10th-century people from the Abbasid Caliphate
Scholars under the Buyid dynasty